William Rutherford Benn, later William Rutherford, (1855-1921) was an English translator and journalist, and a member of the political Benn family. In 1883 he murdered his father, the Reverend Julius Benn, and was detained at Broadmoor Criminal Lunatic Asylum until 1890, returning there in 1903 and receiving treatment until his death.

Early life and family
William Rutherford Benn was born in Poplar, London, in 1855, one of eight children of the Congregational Church minister, the Reverend Julius Benn, and his wife Ann. He married Florence Nicholson on 16 December 1882 at All Saints Church, Wandsworth, south London and, in 1892, William and Florence had a daughter, the actress Margaret Rutherford.

Patricide
In 1883 Benn had been on his honeymoon with his wife Florence in Paris when he suffered a nervous breakdown which it has been speculated may have been caused  or exacerbated by his failure to consummate his marriage to Florence. They had been married 11 weeks when Florence brought him back home, so that his parents could care for him. However, he got worse and was admitted to Bethnal House Asylum. He was collected by his father, Julius Benn, six weeks later, when it appeared that he had recovered. His father subsequently took him to Matlock Bridge, Derbyshire, to rest. There, on 4 March 1883, he  murdered his father using an earthenware chamber pot to hit his father over the head, and attempted to cut his own throat. While in Derby infirmary receiving treatment for his injuries, he threw himself out of a window and fell 20 feet, injuring himself.

He was detained at Broadmoor Criminal Lunatic Asylum. He was visited by his brother, John Williams Benn, who became involved in entertaining the other patients. Benn was released from Broadmoor in July 1890 and subsequently changed his name by deed poll to William Rutherford, using his middle name as his surname. Although his daughter was told that her father had died of "a broken heart" after her mother's suicide, at the age of 12 she found out that he had in fact been readmitted to Broadmoor Hospital in 1903, where he remained under care until his death on 4 August 1921.

Career
In the 1881 census, when he would have been in his mid-20s, Benn was described as a "merchant's clerk". He had a facility with languages and was described by his daughter's biographer Andy Merriman as an "accomplished poet" and by David Benn as "in some way, the most civilised and educated of all the Benns". He worked as a journalist, and in the 1891 census was described as a "translator of languages". In her autobiography, his daughter Margaret described him in her (per Merriman, "somewhat hazy") autobiography as a "traveller in silks in India". Margaret's birth certificate gives her father's occupation as "East India merchant"; a few months after her birth, the family relocated to Madras, India, where William was saddened by the poverty and squalor suffered by the people. Merriman states that, per Tony Benn, William "was a shipping clerk by trade", bringing in extra money "with journalistic commissions". In Dare to be a Daniel (2012), Tony Benn said William "went to India as a journalist". Although life seemed settled, Florence, now pregnant, began to experience mental health problems which her husband, familiar with such things, noticed and sought to mitigate by returning the family to England; before they could do so, Florence hanged herself from a tree. Margaret was subsequently sent to live with an aunt at Wimbledon; when William later sought to remarry, his brother John intervened to stop it.

Death
Benn died at Dartford, Kent, in 1921, having been resident at Broadmoor since 1903.

References

External links 
William Rutherford Benn (1855-1921) - Find A...

1855 births
1921 deaths
English poets
People detained at Broadmoor Hospital
English journalists
English murderers
English translators
Benn family
People from Poplar, London
English emigrants to India
Deaths in mental institutions